Jonathan Jay Pollard (born August 7, 1954) is a former intelligence analyst for the US government. In 1984, Pollard sold numerous closely guarded state secrets, including the National Security Agency's ten-volume manual on how the U.S. gathers its signal intelligence, and disclosed the names of thousands of people who had cooperated with U.S. intelligence agencies. He was apprehended in 1985, and in subsequent proceedings agreed to a plea deal, pleaded guilty to spying for and providing top-secret classified information to Israel. Pollard admitted shopping his services—successfully, in some cases—to other countries. In 1987, he was sentenced to life in prison for violations of the Espionage Act.

The Israeli government acknowledged a portion of its role in Pollard's espionage in 1987, and issued a formal apology to the U.S., but did not admit to paying him until 1998. Over the course of his imprisonment, Israeli officials, US-Israeli activist groups and some US politicians continually lobbied for a reduction or commutation of his sentence. In defense of his actions, Pollard said the American intelligence establishment collectively endangered Israel's security by withholding crucial information. Opposing any form of clemency were many active and retired U.S. officials, including Donald Rumsfeld, Dick Cheney, former CIA director George Tenet; several former U.S. Secretaries of Defense; a bi-partisan group of U.S. congressional leaders; and members of the U.S. intelligence community. They maintained that the damage to U.S. national security due to Pollard's espionage was far more severe, wide-ranging, and enduring than publicly acknowledged. Though Pollard argued that he only supplied Israel with information critical to its security, opponents stated that he had no way of knowing what the Israelis had received through legitimate exchanges, and that much of the data he compromised had nothing to do with Israeli security. Pollard revealed aspects of the U.S. intelligence gathering process, its "sources and methods". In 1995, while imprisoned, he was granted Israeli citizenship.

Pollard was released on November 20, 2015, in accordance with federal guidelines in place at the time of his sentencing. On November 20, 2020, his parole expired and all restrictions were removed. On December 30, 2020, Pollard and his second wife moved to Israel and settled in Jerusalem.

Early life
Jonathan Jay Pollard was born in Galveston, Texas, in 1954, to a Jewish family, the youngest of three siblings born to Morris and Mildred "Molly" Pollard. In 1961, his family moved to South Bend, Indiana, where his father Morris, an award-winning microbiologist, taught at the University of Notre Dame.

At an early age, Pollard became aware of the horrific toll the Holocaust had taken on his immediate family, on his mother's side of the family, the Klein (Kahn) from Vilna in Lithuania, and shortly before his bar mitzvah, he asked his parents to visit the Nazi death camps. Pollard's family made a special effort to instill a sense of Jewish identity in their children, which included devotion to the cause of Israel.

Pollard grew up with what he called a "racial obligation" to Israel, and made his first trip to Israel in 1970, as part of a science program visiting the Weizmann Institute of Science in Rehovot. While there, he was hospitalized after a fight with another student. One Weizmann scientist remembered Pollard as leaving behind "a reputation of being a troublemaker".

After completing high school, Pollard attended Stanford University, where he completed a degree in political science in 1976. While there, he is remembered by several of his acquaintances as having boasted that he was a dual citizen of the United States and Israel, claiming to have worked for Mossad, to have attained the rank of colonel in the Israel Defense Forces (even sending himself a telegram addressed to "Colonel Pollard"), and to have killed an Arab while on guard duty at a kibbutz. He also claimed that his father, Morris Pollard was a CIA operative, and to have fled Czechoslovakia as a child during the Prague Spring in 1968 when his father's CIA role there was discovered. None of these claims were true. Later, Pollard enrolled in several graduate schools, but never completed a post-graduate degree.

Pollard's future wife, Anne Henderson (born 1960), moved to Washington, D.C., in the fall of 1978 to live with her (recently divorced) father, Bernard Henderson. In the summer of 1981, she moved into a house on Capitol Hill with two other women and, through a friend of one of her roommates, she first met Pollard. He later said he had fallen in love during their first meeting—they were "an inseparable couple" by November 1981, and in June 1982, when her Capitol Hill lease expired, she moved into Pollard's apartment in Arlington, Virginia. In December 1982, the couple moved into downtown Washington, D.C., to a two-bedroom apartment at 1733 20th Street NW, near Dupont Circle. They married on August 9, 1985, more than a year after Pollard began spying for Israel, in a civil ceremony in Venice, Italy. At the time of their arrest, in November 1985, they were paying US$750 per month in rent.

Early career
Pollard began applying for intelligence service jobs in 1979 after leaving graduate school, first at the Central Intelligence Agency (CIA) and then at the U.S. Navy. Pollard was turned down for the CIA job after taking a polygraph test in which he admitted to prolific illegal drug usage between 1974 and 1978. He fared better with the Navy, and on September 19, 1979, he was hired by the Navy Field Operational Intelligence Office (NFOIO), an office of the Naval Intelligence Command (NIC). As an intelligence specialist, he was to work on Soviet issues at the Navy Ocean Surveillance Information Center (NOSIC), a department of NFOIO. A background check was required to receive the necessary security clearances, but no polygraph test. In addition to a Top Secret clearance, a more stringent 'Sensitive Compartmented Information' (SCI) clearance was required. The Navy asked for but was denied information from the CIA regarding Pollard, including the results of their pre-employment polygraph test revealing Pollard's excessive drug use. Pollard was given temporary non-SCI security clearances pending completion of his background check, which was normal for new hires at the time. He was assigned to temporary duty at another NIC Department, the Naval Intelligence Support Center (NISC) Surface Ships Division, where he could work on tasks that did not require SCI clearance. NOSIC's current operations center and the NISC were co-located in Suitland, Maryland.

Two months after Pollard was hired, he approached the technical director of NOSIC, Richard Haver, and offered to start a back-channel operation with the South African intelligence service. He also lied about his father being involved with CIA operations in South Africa. Haver became wary of Pollard and requested that he be terminated. However, Haver's boss believed that Pollard's supposed connection with South African intelligence could be useful, and he reassigned him to a Navy human intelligence (HUMINT) operation, Task Force 168 (TF-168). This office was within Naval Intelligence Command (NIC), the headquarters for Navy intelligence operations (located in a separate building, but still within the Suitland Federal Center complex.) It was later discovered that Pollard had lied repeatedly during the vetting process for this position: he denied illegal drug use, claimed his father had been a CIA operative, misrepresented his language abilities and his educational achievements, and claimed to have applied for a commission as officer in the Naval Reserve. A month later Pollard received his SCI clearances and was transferred from NISC to TF-168.

While transferring to his new job at TF-168, Pollard again initiated a meeting with someone far up the chain of command, this time with Admiral Sumner Shapiro, Commander, Naval Intelligence Command (CNIC), about an idea he had for TF-168 and South Africa. (The TF-168 group had passed on his ideas.) After the meeting, Shapiro immediately ordered that Pollard's security clearances be revoked and that he be reassigned to a non-sensitive position. According to The Washington Post, Shapiro dismissed Pollard as a "kook", saying later, "I wish the hell I'd fired him."

Because of the job transfer, Shapiro's order to remove Pollard's security clearances slipped through the cracks. However, Shapiro's office followed up with a request to TF-168 that Pollard be investigated by the CIA. The CIA found Pollard to be a risk and recommended that he not be used in any intelligence collection operation. A subsequent polygraph test was inconclusive, although it did prompt Pollard to admit to making false statements to his superiors, prior drug use, and having unauthorized contacts with representatives of foreign governments. The special agent administering the test felt that Pollard, who at times "began shouting and shaking and making gagging sounds as if he were going to vomit", was feigning illness to invalidate the test. He recommended against Pollard's being granted access to highly classified information. Pollard was also required to be evaluated by a psychiatrist.

Pollard's clearance was reduced to Secret. He subsequently filed a grievance and threatened lawsuits to recover his SCI clearance. While awaiting his grievance to be addressed, he worked on less sensitive material and began receiving excellent performance reviews. In 1982, after the psychiatrist concluded Pollard had no mental illness, Pollard's clearance was upgraded to SCI. In October 1984, after some re-organization of the Navy's intelligence departments, Pollard applied for and was accepted into a position as an analyst for the Naval Intelligence Command.

Espionage

Shortly after Pollard began working at NIC/TF-168, he met Aviem Sella, a combat veteran of the Israeli Air Force. At the time, Sella was on leave from his position as a colonel to gain a master's degree in computer science as a graduate student at New York University. Pollard told Sella that he worked for U.S. naval intelligence, told him about specific incidents where U.S. intelligence was withholding information from Israel, and offered to work as a spy. Though Sella had wondered whether Pollard was part of an FBI sting operation to recruit an Israeli, he ended up believing him. Sella phoned his air-force intelligence commander in Tel Aviv for further instructions, and the call was switched to the Air Force chief of staff. Sella was ordered to develop a contact with Pollard, but to be careful. He was warned that either the Americans were offering a "dangle" in order to root out foreign intelligence operations, or if this was a genuine spy, Sella would have to pay careful attention to his work.

Within a few days, in June 1984, Pollard started passing classified information to Sella. He was paid $10,000 cash and given a very expensive diamond and sapphire ring, which Pollard later offered to his girlfriend Anne when proposing to her. Pollard was paid well by the Israelis: he received a salary that eventually reached $2,500 a month, and tens of thousands of dollars in cash disbursements for hotels, meals, and jewelry. In his pre-sentencing statement to Judge Robinson, Pollard said the money was a benefit that was forced on him. "I did accept money for my services", he acknowledged, but only "as a reflection of how well I was doing my job". He said that he had later told his controller, Rafi Eitan, a long-time spy who at the time headed Lekem, a scientific-intelligence unit in Israel, that, "I not only intended to repay all the money I'd received, but, also, was going to establish a chair at the Israeli General Staff's Intelligence Training Center outside Tel Aviv."

Naval Criminal Investigative Service (NCIS) investigator Ronald Olive has alleged that Pollard passed classified information to South Africa, and attempted, through a third party, to sell classified information to Pakistan on multiple occasions. Pollard also stole classified documents related to China on behalf of his wife, who used the information to advance her personal business interests. She kept these secret materials around the house, where investigating authorities discovered them when Pollard's espionage activity came to light.

During Pollard's trial, the U.S. government's memorandum in aid of sentencing challenged the "defendant's claim that he was motivated by altruism rather than greed". The government said that Pollard had "disclosed classified information in anticipation of financial gain" in other instances:

The government's investigation has revealed that defendant provided to certain of his acquaintances U.S. classified documents which defendant obtained through U.S. Navy sources. The classified documents which defendant disclosed to two such acquaintances, both of whom are professional investment advisers, contained classified economic and political analyses which defendant believed would help his acquaintances render investment advice to their clients ... Defendant acknowledged that, although he was not paid for his unauthorized disclosures of classified information to the above-mentioned acquaintances, he hoped to be rewarded ultimately through business opportunities that these individuals could arrange for defendant when he eventually left his position with the U.S. Navy. In fact, defendant was involved in an ongoing business venture with two of these acquaintances at the time he provided the classified information to them ...

During the course of the Pollard trial, Australian authorities reported the disclosure of classified American documents by Pollard to a Royal Australian Navy officer who had been engaged in a personnel-exchange naval-liaison program between the U.S. and Australia. The Australian officer, alarmed by Pollard's repeated disclosure to him of data caveated No Foreign Access Allowed, reported the indiscretions to his chain of command. It recalled the officer from his position in the U.S., fearing that the disclosures might be part of a "CIA ruse". Confronted with this accusation after entering his plea, Pollard admitted only to passing a single classified document to the Australian; later, he changed his story, and claimed that his superiors ordered him to share information with the Australians.

, the full extent of the information Pollard passed to Israel has still not been officially revealed. Press reports cited a secret 46-page memorandum, which Pollard and his attorneys were allowed to view. They were provided to the judge by Secretary of Defense Caspar Weinberger, who described Pollard's spying as including, among other things, obtaining and copying the latest version of Radio-Signal Notations (RASIN), a 10-volume manual comprehensively detailing America's global electronic surveillance network.

After Pollard's release, the former deputy head of the Mossad Ram Ben Barak publicly regretted Pollard, saying that the recruitment and operation "were unknown by the intelligence leadership and unauthorized" with the resultant damage to the US-Israeli relationship far outweighing the value of the intelligence Pollard provided. "Our entire relationship with the U.S. deteriorated because of this. People lost jobs over it", according to Barak. "It made for years and years of suspicion, with Americans suspecting he wasn't the only one, and feeling that they hadn't gotten the necessary explanations. They didn't believe it wasn't authorized. It caused huge, huge damage. They saw it as a betrayal of them."

Capture
Pollard's espionage nearly came to light in 1984 when a department head noted a report on Soviet military equipment and questioned why it was germane to the office. Pollard, to whom the report was traced, was asked about it, and he replied that he had been working on terrorist networks, which was accepted as valid. In 1985, a co-worker anonymously reported Pollard's removal of classified material from the NIC. The coworker noted that Pollard did not seem to be taking the material to any known appropriate destination, such as other intelligence agencies in the area. Although Pollard was authorized to transport documents and the coworker said the documents were properly wrapped, it appeared out of place that Pollard would be transporting documents on a Friday afternoon when there was little going on and people seemed to be focused on an upcoming long weekend. Ultimately, that report was not acted upon as it was felt it occurred within business hours and Pollard had business being in other offices.
In another instance Pollard's direct superior, having to complete extra work at the office on a Saturday, had walked by Pollard's desk and noticed unsecured classified material. Taking the initiative to secure it, the supervisor glanced over it and saw it was unrelated to antiterrorism matters in the Caribbean, on which the section was focused. Looking at more unrelated documents, the supervisor believed foreign intelligence might be involved, but was unable to determine which nation might be interested.

Pollard was stopped and questioned by FBI agents about a week later while removing classified material from his work premises. He explained that he was taking it to another analyst at a different agency for a consultation. His story was checked and found to be false. Pollard requested a phone call to his wife to tell her where he was. As the interview was voluntary, the investigators had no choice but to grant the request. During the call to Anne, Pollard used the code word "cactus", signaling that he was in trouble, and that she should remove all classified material from their home. She attempted to do this, enlisting the help of a neighbor.

Pollard later agreed to a search of his home, which found the few documents which Anne had missed. At this point, the FBI decided to cede the case to Pollard's supervisors, since they had uncovered only mishandling of documents, with no proof that Pollard was passing classified information. The case broke wide open a few days later, when Pollard was asked by his superiors to take a polygraph test. Instead, he admitted to illegally passing on documents, without mentioning Israel. The FBI again became involved. A short time later, Pollard's neighbor, a naval officer, became concerned about safeguarding the  suitcase full of highly classified material that Anne had given him, and began calling around the military intelligence community asking for advice. He cooperated fully with the investigation and was never charged with any crime.

After his partial confession, Pollard was put under surveillance, but not taken into custody. On November 21, 1985, he and his wife tried to gain asylum at the Israeli Embassy in Washington, D.C., but they were ordered to leave by Israeli guards. FBI agents arrested Pollard as soon as he left embassy property. His handler, Rafi Eitan, stated in a 2014 interview that Pollard had been warned that he was uncovered and that he had given him a prearranged signal to leave the United States, but instead Pollard "wandered around for three days with them following him. He had many opportunities to do what I told him and he didn't do it." Eitan claimed that he had given the order to evict Pollard from the embassy.

After Pollard's arrest, Anne evaded an FBI agent who was following her, met Sella at a restaurant, and told him of her husband's arrest. As a result, three Israeli diplomatic personnel involved in the operation were also informed: science attachés Yosef Yagur and Ilan Ravid, and embassy secretary Irit Erb. LAKAM had not foreseen this turn of events nor crafted escape plans, and they were told to flee immediately. The apartment where the documents stolen by Pollard were kept and copied was cleared out, and all four immediately fled Washington. Sella and his wife took a train to New York and caught a flight to London, Yagur fled to Canada, Erb to Mexico, and Ravid to Miami, from where they caught connecting flights to Israel. All were out of the United States in 24 hours. Anne was arrested the next day, November 22, 1985.

Investigation
Prior to Pollard's plea bargain, the U.S. government began preparing a multi-count criminal indictment against him, which included drug offences and tax fraud along with espionage. The government alleged that Pollard used classified documents to unsuccessfully broker an arms deal with the governments of South Africa, Argentina, and Taiwan. FBI investigators also determined that Pollard met with three Pakistanis and an Iranian foreigner in an attempt to broker arms in 1985. Pollard eventually cooperated with investigators in exchange for a plea agreement for leniency for himself and his wife. Israel said initially that Pollard worked for an unauthorized rogue operation, a position they maintained for more than ten years. They finally agreed to cooperate with the investigation in exchange for immunity for the Israelis involved.

When asked to return the stolen material, the Israelis reportedly supplied only a few dozen less sensitive documents. At the time, the Americans knew that Pollard had passed tens of thousands of documents.

The Israelis created a schedule designed to wear the American investigators down, including many hours per day of commuting in blacked-out buses on rough roads, and frequent switching of buses, leaving them without adequate time to sleep, and preventing them from sleeping on the commute. The identity of Pollard's original handler, Sella, was withheld. All questions had to be translated into Hebrew and answered in Hebrew, and then translated back into English, even though all the parties spoke perfect English. The Commander Jerry Agee remembers that, even as he departed the airport, airport security made a point of informing him that "you will never be coming back here again." After his return to the US, Agee found various items had been stolen from his luggage. The abuse came not only from the guards and officials, but also the Israeli media.

Sella was eventually indicted on three counts of espionage by a United States court. Israel refused to allow Sella to be interviewed unless he was granted immunity. The United States refused because of Israel's previous failure to cooperate as promised. Israel refused to extradite Sella, instead giving him command of Tel Nof Airbase. The U.S. Congress responded by threatening to cut aid to Israel, at which point Sella voluntarily stepped down to defuse tensions.

During the morning of January 20, 2021, the last half-day of Donald Trump's U.S. Presidency, the White House announced that Trump had granted a full pardon to Sella. The announcement stated that the State of Israel had requested the pardon and had issued a full and unequivocal apology. The announcement also stated that Prime Minister of Israel Benjamin Netanyahu, Israeli Ambassador to the United States Ron Dermer, United States Ambassador to Israel David Friedman and Miriam Adelson had supported Sella's request for clemency.

Trial
Pollard's plea discussions with the government sought both to avoid a life sentence for him and to allow Anne Pollard to plead to lesser charges, which the government was otherwise unwilling to let her do. The government, however, did eventually offer Anne Pollard a plea agreement provided that Jonathan Pollard assist the government in its damage assessment. As part of this process, he agreed to polygraph examinations, and interviews with FBI agents and Department of Justice attorneys over a period of several months. In late May 1986, the government offered him a plea agreement, which he accepted. By the terms of that agreement, Pollard was required to plead guilty to one count of conspiracy to deliver national defense information to a foreign government, which carried a maximum prison term of life, and to cooperate fully with the government's ongoing investigation. He promised not to disseminate any information concerning his crimes or his case, or to speak publicly about any classified information, without first receiving permission from the Director of Naval Intelligence. He further agreed that failure by Anne Pollard to adhere to the terms of her agreement entitled the government to void his agreement, and vice versa. In return for Pollard's plea, the government promised not to charge him with additional crimes.

Three weeks before Pollard's sentencing, Wolf Blitzer, at the time a Jerusalem Post correspondent, conducted a jail-cell interview with Pollard. The interview formed the basis of Blitzer's newspaper article, which also ran in The Washington Post on February 15, 1987, under the headline "Pollard: Not A Bumbler, but Israel's Master Spy". Pollard told Blitzer about some of the information he provided the Israelis: reconnaissance satellite photography of Palestine Liberation Organization (PLO) headquarters in Tunisia, which was used for Operation Wooden Leg; specific capabilities of Libya's air defenses; and "the pick of U.S. intelligence about Arab and Islamic conventional and unconventional military activity, from Morocco to Pakistan and every country in between. This included both 'friendly' and 'unfriendly' Arab countries." Prosecutor Joseph diGenova presented the Blitzer prison interview as evidence in his sentencing memorandum that Pollard had engaged in "unauthorized disclosure of classified information".

Prior to sentencing, Pollard and his wife Anne gave further defiant media interviews in which they defended their spying and attempted to rally Jewish Americans to their cause, diGenova said. In a 60 Minutes interview from prison, Anne said, "I feel my husband and I did what we were expected to do, and what our moral obligation was as Jews, what our moral obligation was as human beings, and I have no regrets about that." 

On June 4, 1986, Pollard pleaded guilty to one count of conspiracy to deliver national defense information to a foreign government. Prior to sentencing, speaking on his own behalf, Pollard stated that while his motives "may have been well meaning, they cannot, under any stretch of the imagination, excuse or justify the violation of the law, particularly one that involves the trust of government ... I broke trust, ruined and brought disgrace to my family." He admitted and apologized for taking money from the Israeli government in exchange for classified information. Anne Pollard, in her own statement, stated that she did "what at the time I believed to be correct" in helping her husband and attempting to conceal stolen documents, adding, "And I can't say that I would never help him again. However, I would look for different routes or different ways."

The prosecution answered these statements by saying that the Pollards had continued to violate numerous nondisclosure agreements even as the trial was taking place. The prosecutor, Joseph E. diGenova noted one in particular, which had been signed in June 1986, alluding to Pollard's interview with Wolf Blitzer. The prosecutor concluded:

[I]n combination with the breadth of this man's knowledge, the depth of his memory, and the complete lack of honor that he has demonstrated in these proceedings, I suggest to you, your honor, he is a very dangerous man.

"The government did something highly suspicious by forgetting to send anyone to monitor these interviews", Esther Pollard said. "Later, at sentencing, the prosecutor successfully inflamed the judge against Jonathan by falsely claiming that not only had the interviews been secretly arranged behind their backs, but that Jonathan had also disclosed highly classified material to Blitzer that compromised the intelligence community's sources and methods."

Sentencing and incarceration
The Pollards' sentencing took place on March 4, 1987. While the prosecutor, in compliance with the plea agreement, recommended that Pollard receive "only a substantial number of years in prison", Judge Aubrey Robinson Jr. was not obligated to follow the recommendation. Noting that Pollard had violated multiple conditions of the plea agreement, he imposed a life sentence on the basis of a classified damage-assessment memorandum submitted by Secretary of Defense Caspar Weinberger.

Pollard was then moved from FCC Petersburg in Virginia, where he had been held since 1986, to a federal prison hospital in Springfield, Missouri, to undergo a battery of mental health tests. In June 1988, he was transferred to USP Marion and in 1993 to FCI Butner Medium at the Butner Federal Correction Complex in North Carolina. In May 1991, Pollard asked Avi Weiss to be his personal rabbi. Israeli Chief Rabbi Mordechai Eliyahu was also a supporter of Pollard, and campaigned for his release from prison.

Anne Pollard was sentenced to five years, but was paroled after three and a half years due to health problems. Pollard filed for divorce after Anne's release. While he reportedly said that he expected to be jailed for the remainder of his life, and did not want Anne to be bound to him, Anne later told a reporter that the divorce papers were served with no warning or explanation of any kind.

After finalization of his divorce from Anne, Pollard married Esther "Elaine" Zeitz, a Canadian teacher and activist based in Toronto who had organized a campaign for his release. In 1996, she initiated a public hunger strike, but ended it 19 days later after meeting with Israeli Prime Minister Benjamin Netanyahu, who pledged to step up his efforts to secure Pollard's release. Media sources and Pollard family members have questioned whether Pollard and Zeitz are legally wed. Prison officials told Ha'aretz that there is no record of a marriage ceremony having been requested or conducted. After completing her parole, Anne Pollard emigrated to Israel, where she lived in Tel Aviv on a government stipend supplemented by occasional private donations.

Appeals
In 1989, Pollard's attorneys filed a motion for withdrawal of his guilty plea and trial by jury due to the government's failure to abide by terms of the plea agreement. The motion was denied. An appeals court affirmed the denial. Several years later, with a different attorney, Pollard filed a petition for habeas corpus. A panel of the U.S. Court of Appeals for the District of Columbia Circuit ruled two-to-one to deny Pollard's petition, primarily due to the failure of Pollard's original attorneys to file his appeal in a timely manner. Judge Stephen F. Williams dissented, "because the government's breach of the plea agreement was a fundamental miscarriage of justice requiring relief under 28 U.S.C. § 2255".

In July 2005, Pollard again filed a motion for a new trial, this time on the grounds of ineffective assistance of counsel. He also sought access to classified documents pertinent to his new lawyers' efforts in preparing a clemency petition. The Court of Appeals rejected both arguments. In February 2006, his attorneys filed a petition for certiorari with the United States Supreme Court regarding access to the classified documents. They argued that the separation of powers doctrine is a flexible doctrine that does not dictate the complete separation of the three branches of Government from one another. The brief claimed that the Court of Appeals violated this principle in asserting sua sponte that the judiciary has no jurisdiction over the classified documents due to the fact that access was for the ultimate purpose of clemency, an executive function. The Supreme Court denied the cert petition in March 2006, ruling that the president's clemency power would be wholly unaffected by successor counsel's access to the classified documents, and that the classified documents were sealed under protective order, a judicial tool.

Israeli efforts to secure Pollard's release
In 1988, Israel proposed a three-way exchange, wherein Pollard and his wife would be released and deported to Israel, Israel would release Soviet spy Marcus Klingberg, and the Soviet Union would exercise its influence with Syria and Iran to release American hostages held there by Syrian- and Iranian-sponsored terrorist groups.

In 1990, Israel reportedly considered offering to release Yosef Amit, an Israeli military intelligence officer serving a 12-year sentence for spying for the United States and another NATO power, in exchange for Pollard. Sources conflict on the outcome: according to one, Amit made it known that he had no wish to be exchanged. By another account, Israeli officials vetoed the idea, fearing that it would only stoke more anger in the United States. (Amit served out his sentence and was released in 1993.)

In the 1990s former University of Notre Dame president Theodore Hesburgh, a family friend of Pollard's, attempted to broker a deal whereby Pollard would be released, "be banished to Israel", and would renounce his U.S. citizenship. Mike Royko of the Chicago Tribune wrote columns in February 1994 supporting the idea. White House officials expressed little enthusiasm for Hesburgh's plan, and he ceased further efforts.

In 1995, Israel again attempted to set up a three-way exchange, this time involving American spies imprisoned in Russia: Israel would release Klingberg, the Russians would release U.S. agents who had remained in prison since the dissolution of the Soviet Union, and the United States would then free Pollard.

Israel's official position until 1998 was that Pollard worked for an unauthorized rogue organization. In May of that year, Prime Minister Netanyahu admitted that Pollard had in fact been an Israeli agent, answering directly to high-ranking officials of Lekem, the Israeli Bureau for Scientific Relations. The Israeli government paid at least two of the attorneys—Richard A. Hibey and Hamilton Philip Fox III—working for his release.

During campaigning leading up to the 1999 Israeli general election, Netanyahu and his challenger Ehud Barak exchanged barbs in the media over which had been more supportive of Pollard. In 2002, Netanyahu visited Pollard in prison. In 2007 he pledged that, if re-elected Prime Minister, he would bring about Pollard's release.

In September 2009, Israeli State Comptroller Micha Lindenstrauss released a report stating that repeated petitions for Pollard's release over a 20-year period had been rebuffed by the American government. The Pollard family criticized the report, calling it a "whitewash" of the Israeli government's activities, although they agreed with its assertion that Pollard had been denied due legal process.

In June 2011, 70 members of the Israeli parliament, the Knesset, lent their support to the Pollard family's request that President Obama allow Pollard to visit his ailing father, Morris. When Morris died soon after, Netanyahu announced Israel's official support for Pollard's request to attend his father's funeral. Both requests were denied.

In November 2014, Rafi Eitan, who headed Lekem from 1981 until its dissolution in 1986, admitted that he knew in advance of Pollard's impending arrest in 1985 and alerted then-Prime Minister Shimon Peres and Defense Minister Yitzhak Rabin. Eitan says it was his decision to refuse Pollard's request for asylum in the Israeli Embassy. When asked if Israeli officials were aware of Pollard's espionage activities, he replied, "Of course."

Citizenship
Pollard applied for Israeli citizenship in 1995; the Ministry of Interior initially refused on grounds that Israel did not grant citizenship to persons who had not yet immigrated, but reversed its decision and granted the petition on November 22, 1995.

Some sources claim that Pollard then renounced his United States citizenship, was now solely an Israeli citizen, and would be deported to Israel if he were released from prison. Others continue to identify him as a U.S. citizen. According to the United States Department of State, there are no peacetime regulations in effect under  to empower the Attorney General to process renunciations of citizenship from persons physically present in the United States, and under , it is not possible for a person to lose U.S. citizenship while physically present in the United States except by renunciation filed with the Attorney General, or conviction of treason.

On December 30, 2020, Jonathan Pollard and his wife officially immigrated to Israel and became full Israeli citizens.

Official reactions and public pro-Pollard campaigns

In addition to the release requests by the Israeli government, there was a long-running public campaign to free Pollard. The organizers include the Pollard family, his ex-wife, Anne, and Jewish groups in the U.S. and Israel. The campaign's main points claimed that Pollard spied for an ally instead of an enemy, that his sentence was out of proportion to those given to others who committed similar crimes, and that the U.S. failed to live up to its plea bargain. Some Israeli activists compared President Bush to Hamas and Hezbollah leaders who have taken Israeli soldiers prisoner.

Some who feel the sentence was excessive point out that although Pollard pleaded guilty as part of a plea bargain for himself and his wife, he was shown no leniency, and was given the maximum sentence with the exception of death; Pollard's opponents answer that Pollard broke the terms of that plea agreement even before the sentence was handed down.

In 1993, political science professor and Orthodox Jewish activist David Luchins organized an unsuccessful appeal to President Bill Clinton to commute Pollard's sentence. The appeal included a letter of remorse from Pollard in which he admitted violating both U.S. laws and Jewish religious tenets. Pollard later reportedly regretted his admission, suspecting that it worsened his chances for clemency. Pollard loyalists blamed Luchins, who received death threats and required federal protection for a period of time.

The issue of his imprisonment has sometimes arisen amidst Israeli domestic politics. Benjamin Netanyahu has been particularly vocal in lobbying for Pollard's release, visiting Pollard in prison in 2002. He raised the issue with President Clinton during the Wye River peace talks in October 1998. In his autobiography, Clinton wrote that he was inclined to release Pollard, but the objections of U.S. intelligence officials were too strong:

For all the sympathy Pollard generated in Israel, he was a hard case to push in America; he had sold our country's secrets for money, not conviction, and for years had not shown any remorse. When I talked to Sandy Berger and George Tenet, they were adamantly opposed to letting Pollard go, as was Madeleine Albright.

Alan Dershowitz has been among Pollard's high-profile supporters, both in the courtroom as a lawyer and in various print media. Characterizing the sentence as "excessive", Dershowitz writes in an article reprinted in his bestselling book Chutzpah, "As an American, and as a Jew, I hereby express my outrage at Jonathan Pollard's sentence of life imprisonment for the crime to which he pleaded guilty." Dershowitz writes:

[E]veryone seems frightened to speak up on behalf of a convicted spy. This has been especially true of the Jewish leadership in America. The Pollards are Jewish. … The Pollards are also Zionists, who—out of a sense of misguided "racial imperative" (to quote Jonathan Pollard)—seem to place their commitment to Israeli survival over the laws of their own country. … American Jewish leaders, always sensitive to the canard of dual loyalty, are keeping a low profile in the Pollard matter. Many American Jews at the grass roots are outraged at what they perceive to be an overreaction to the Pollards' crimes and the unusually long sentence imposed on Jonathan Pollard.

In 2012, Malcolm Hoenlein called for Pollards' release, saying "27 years—he's paid the price for his crimes. He has expressed remorse. Enough is enough. It's time that he be let go—there is no justification that we can see for keeping him any longer, there's no cause of justice, no security interest that could possibly be served."

In 2013, Rabbi Pesach Lerner, executive vice president of the National Council of Young Israel, cited hypocrisy of Pollard's imprisonment in America after revelations of spying against U.S. allies by the United States intelligence agencies.

The Jerusalem City Council has also acted in support of Pollard, changing the name of a square near the official prime minister's residence from Paris Square to Freedom for Jonathan Pollard Square. 

Pollard claimed that he provided only information that was vital to Israeli security, and that it was being withheld by the Pentagon, in violation of a 1983 memorandum of understanding between the two countries. The memorandum of understanding was an agreement between the United States and Israel regarding the sharing of vital security intelligence. According to Pollard, this included data on Soviet arms shipments to Syria, Iraqi and Syrian chemical weapons, the Pakistani atomic bomb project, and Libyan air defense systems. According to the declassified CIA 1987 damage assessment of the Pollard case, under the heading "What the Israelis Did Not Ask For", the assessment notes that the Israelis "never expressed interest in U.S. military activities, plans, capabilities, or equipment". Pollard's defense claimed that Israel had the legal rights to the information that Pollard passed to Israel based upon the 1983 Memorandum of understanding and the United States was breaching that Memorandum.

Lee Hamilton, a former U.S. congressman from Indiana who was chairman of the House Intelligence Committee at the time of Pollard's sentencing, wrote an emotional letter to President Obama in 2011 supporting commutation of Pollard's sentence. "I have been acquainted for many years with members of his family, especially his parents, and I know how much pain and anguish they have suffered because of their son's incarceration", he wrote. Hamilton added that Pollard's father, whose health was failing rapidly, deserved to see his son freed.

In 2010, representatives Barney Frank (D-Mass.), Edolphus Towns (D-N.Y.), Anthony Weiner (D-N.Y.), and Bill Pascrell (D-N.J.) wrote a letter that "notes the positive impact that a grant of clemency would have in Israel, as a strong indication of the goodwill of our nation towards Israel and the Israeli people". In November 2010, Weiner stated: "No one in the history of the United States who did something similar to Jonathan Pollard served a life sentence, nor should he."

Dennis B. Ross said in 2004: "Pollard received a harsher sentence than others who committed comparable crimes." Former U.S. Secretary of Defense Caspar Weinberger stated that "[t]he Pollard matter was comparatively minor. It was made far bigger than its actual importance." Stephen Fain Williams, a Senior Circuit Judge on the United States Court of Appeals for the District of Columbia Circuit stated: "Jonathan Pollard's life sentence represents a fundamental miscarriage of justice". In December 2010, former U.S. assistant Secretary of Defense Lawrence Korb said: "In retrospect, we know that an injustice was done to Pollard ... the man is very sick and should be released before it is too late." 
Some of the accusations against Pollard can be traced to CIA mole Aldrich Ames, who allegedly blamed Pollard to clear himself of suspicion. Rafi Eitan, Pollard's Israeli handler, stated that Pollard never exposed American agents in the Soviet Union or elsewhere. Eitan said he believed Ames tried to blame Pollard to clear himself of suspicion.

On November 18, 2010, 39 members of Congress submitted a plea of clemency to the White House on behalf of Pollard, asking the president for his immediate release: "We see clemency for Mr. Pollard as an act of compassion justified by the way others have been treated by our justice system." They stated how there has been a great disparity by the amount of time that Pollard has served and by others who were found guilty of similar activities.

Former White House Counsel, Bernard Nussbaum, wrote a letter on January 28, 2011, to President Obama stating that he extensively reviewed the Jonathan Pollard file while he served in the White House. In his letter, he stated, "that a failure at this time to commute his sentence would not serve the course of justice; indeed, I respectfully believe, it would be a miscarriage of justice".

Former Secretary of State George Shultz also wrote a letter to President Obama on January 11, 2011, urging that Pollard sentence to be commuted. He stated, "I am impressed that the people who are best informed about the classified material he passed to Israel, former CIA Director James Woolsey and former Chairman of the Senate Intelligence Committee Dennis DeConcini, favor his release."

In 2011, Henry Kissinger, former U.S. secretary of state, declared that the time had come to commute the sentence of Pollard. On March 3, 2011, Kissinger wrote a letter to President Obama stating, "Having talked with George Shultz and read the statements of former CIA Director Woolsey, former Senate Intelligence Committee Chairman DeConcini, former Defense Secretary Weinberger, former Attorney General Mukasey and others whose judgement and first-hand knowledge of the case I respect, I find their unanimous support for clemency compelling. I believe justice would be served by commuting the remainder of Jonathan Pollard's sentence of life imprisonment".

Lawrence Korb, former Assistant Secretary of Defense under Ronald Reagan, called on the Obama Administration to grant clemency to Pollard:

Some now argue that Pollard should be released because it would improve U.S.-Israeli relations and enhance the prospects of success of the Obama administration's Middle East peace process. Although that may be true, it is not the reason I and many others have recently written to the president requesting that he grant Pollard clemency. The reason is that Pollard has already served far too long for the crime for which he was convicted, and by now, whatever facts he might know would have little effect on national security.

In the words of Lawrence Korb, "We believe that his continued incarceration constitutes a travesty of justice and a stain on the American system of justice."

Former Vice President Dan Quayle wrote a letter to President Obama on January 31, 2011, urging him to commute Pollard's sentence.

On February 16, 2011, Arlen Specter wrote a letter to President Obama, stating that, as the chairman of the Senate Intelligence Committee, he believed Pollard should be pardoned. Specter was the second chairman of the Senate Intelligence Committee (the first was Dennis DeConcini) to publicly call for Pollard's release.

On March 22, 2011, more than one hundred New York State legislators signed a petition to President Obama stating, "that we see clemency for Mr. Pollard as an act of compassion justified by the way others have been treated by our justice system".

Christine Quinn, Speaker of the New York City Council, wrote a letter to President Obama on December 26, 2012, formally requesting that he commute Pollard's sentence. She stated that he has expressed great remorse. She wrote, "I know I share similar views with many past and current American elected officials" and "therefore, I respectfully urge you to use your constitutional power to treat Mr. Pollard the way others have been treated by our nation's justice system."

In August 2011 Barney Frank sought permission from Congress to discuss the incarceration of Jonathan Pollard and called on Barack Obama to "answer the many calls for Pollard's immediate release". Frank said Pollard has paid a price much higher than anyone else that spied for a friend of the United States and more than many who spied for its enemies.

Congressman Allen West from Florida, wrote a letter to President Obama on June 2, 2011, stating, "After serving 26 years behind bars, Jonathan Pollard's health is deteriorating, as is his wife's. If we can consent to the release by the British of the Lockerbie bomber back to Libya due to health concern, how can we justify keeping Mr. Pollard behind bars when his crimes were clearly not as serious as a terrorist who murdered hundreds of Americans?"

On October 26, 2011, a bi-partisan group of 18 retired U.S. senators wrote to President Obama urging him to commute Jonathan Pollard's prison sentence to time served. The letter included senators who initially opposed his release. In the letter, it stated, "Mr. Pollard will complete his 26th year of incarceration on November 21, 2011 and begin his 27th year of an unprecedented life sentence (seven of which were spent in solitary confinement). He was indicted on one count of passing classified information to an ally without intent to harm the United States—an offense that normally results in a 2–4 year sentence. He pled guilty under a plea agreement with which he fully complied, but which was ignored by the sentencing judge. Mr. Pollard is the only person in the history of the U.S. to receive a life sentence for passing classified information to an ally." They conclude, "It is patently clear that Mr. Pollard's sentence is severely disproportionate and (as several federal judges have noted) a gross miscarriage of justice."

In a letter to the editor of The Wall Street Journal, published on July 5, 2012, James Woolsey wrote that he now supports release of the convicted spy for Israel, citing the passage of time: "When I recommended against clemency, Pollard had been in prison less than a decade. Today he has been incarcerated for over a quarter of a century under his life sentence." He pointed out that of the more than 50 recently convicted Soviet and Chinese spies, only two received life sentences, and two-thirds were sentenced to less time than Pollard has served so far. He further stated that "Pollard has cooperated fully with the U.S. government, pledged not to profit from his crime (e.g., from book sales), and has many times expressed remorse for what he did." Woolsey expressed his belief that Pollard is still imprisoned only because he is Jewish. He said, "anti-Semitism played a role in the continued detention of Pollard." "For those hung up for some reason on the fact that he's an American Jew, pretend he's a Greek- or Korean- or Filipino-American and free him", Woolsey, who is not Jewish, said in his letter to the Wall Street Journal.

Angelo Codevilla, who has followed the Pollard case since serving as a senior staff member for the Senate intelligence committee from 1978 to 1985, argued that the swarm of accusations against Pollard over the years is implausible. On November 15, 2013, Professor Codevilla wrote a letter to President Obama, stating, "Others have pointed out that Pollard is the only person ever sentenced to life imprisonment for passing information to an ally, without intent to harm America, a crime which normally carries a sentence of 2–4 years; and that this disproportionate sentence in violation of a plea agreement was based not on the indictment, but on a memorandum that was never shared with the defense. This is not how American justice is supposed to work." In an interview to the Weekly Standard, Codevilla stated, "The story of the Pollard case is a blot on American justice." The life sentence "makes you ashamed to be an American".

Former Speaker of the House Newt Gingrich expressed support for releasing Pollard.

According to American intelligence expert John Loftus, former U.S. government prosecutor and army intelligence officer, Pollard could not have revealed the identities of American spies, as Pollard lacked the security clearance to access this information. In the opinion of Loftus, "Pollard's continued incarceration is due to horrible stupidity."

Official requests for clemency
Yitzhak Rabin was the first Israeli prime minister to intervene on Pollard's behalf; in 1995, he petitioned President Bill Clinton for a pardon. Other requests followed. At a critical juncture in the Israeli-Palestinian peace negotiations at the Wye River Conference in 1998, Prime Minister Benjamin Netanyahu attempted to make the outcome contingent on Pollard's release. "If we signed an agreement with Arafat, I expected a pardon for Pollard", he wrote. Clinton later confirmed in his memoir that he tentatively agreed to the condition, "but I would have to check with our people". When that information was made public, the American intelligence community responded immediately, with unequivocal anger. Seven former Secretaries of Defense—Donald Rumsfeld, Melvin R. Laird, Frank C. Carlucci, Richard B. Cheney, Caspar W. Weinberger, James R. Schlesinger and Elliot L. Richardson—along with several senior Congressional leaders, publicly voiced their vigorous opposition to any form of clemency. Central Intelligence Agency director George J. Tenet initially denied reports that he had threatened to resign if Pollard were to be released, but eventually confirmed that he had. Other Clinton advisors, including Madeleine Albright and Sandy Berger, were "adamantly opposed" to clemency as well. Clinton, who had not expected such forceful opposition, told Netanyahu that Pollard's release could not be a condition of the agreement, and ordered a formal review of Pollard's case. Dennis Ross confirmed Clinton's version of events in his book The Missing Peace.

Another Israeli request was made in New York on September 14, 2005, and declined by President George W. Bush. A request that Pollard be designated a Prisoner of Zion was rejected by the High Court of Justice of Israel on January 16, 2006. Another appeal for intervention on Pollard's behalf was rejected by the High Court on March 20, 2006.

On January 10, 2008, the subject of Pollard's pardon was again brought up for discussion, this time by Prime Minister Ehud Olmert, during President George W. Bush's first visit to Israel as president. Subsequently, this request was turned down by President Bush. The next day, at a dinner attended by several ministers in the Israeli government (in addition to U.S. Secretary of State Condoleezza Rice), the subject of Pollard's release was again discussed. This time, however, Prime Minister Olmert commented that it was not the appropriate occasion to discuss Pollard's fate.

As President Bush was about to leave office in 2009, Pollard himself requested clemency for the first time. In an interview in Newsweek, former CIA director James Woolsey endorsed Pollard's release on two conditions: that he show contrition and decline any profits from books or other projects linked to the case. Bush did not pardon him.

The New York Times reported on September 21, 2010, that the Israeli government (again under Netanyahu) informally proposed that Pollard be released as a reward to Israel for extending by three months a halt to new settlements in occupied territories.

On January 24, 2011, Netanyahu submitted the first formal public request for clemency in the form of a letter to President Obama. In 2012, President Shimon Peres presented to Obama a letter signed by 80 Israeli legislators, requesting Pollard's release on behalf of the citizens of Israel. In November 2013, Jewish Agency chairman Natan Sharansky said, "It is unprecedented in the history of the U.S. that someone who spied for a friendly country served even half the time [that Pollard has] in prison."

In late March 2014, U.S. Secretary of State John Kerry reportedly offered to release Pollard as an incentive to Israel to resume negotiations with the Palestinians toward the formation of a Palestinian state. The White House, however, announced that no decision had been made on any agreement involving Pollard.

In October 2014, Elyakim Rubinstein, an Israeli Supreme Court Justice, former attorney general, and the acting Israeli ambassador to the US at the time of Pollard's arrest, called for Pollard's pardon. He said "Mistakes were made, mainly by the Israelis, but by the Americans as well, and 29 years [is] enough."

In a November 2014 letter to President Obama, a group of American officials, including former CIA director James Woolsey, former Assistant U.S. Defense Secretary Lawrence Korb, and former U.S. National Security Advisor Robert McFarlane, criticized the "unjust denial of parole" for Pollard whose "grossly disproportionate sentence continues". They called the charge used to keep him imprisoned "patently false".

Opposition
Critics allege that Pollard's espionage, which compromised elements of four major intelligence systems, damaged American national security far more than was ever publicly acknowledged. They have charged that he was motivated not by patriotism or concern for Israel's security, but by greed; that Israel paid him well, and he spent the money on cocaine, alcohol, and expensive meals. Many intelligence officials are convinced that at least some of the information Pollard sold to Israel eventually wound up in the Soviet Union, although officials interviewed by investigative journalist Seymour Hersh acknowledged that they had no hard evidence. In 1999, Hersh summarized the case against Pollard in The New Yorker.

Four former directors of Naval Intelligence—William Studeman, Sumner Shapiro, John L. Butts, and Thomas Brooks—issued a public response to the call for clemency, and what they termed "the myths that have arisen from this clever public relations campaign ... aimed at transforming Pollard from greedy, arrogant betrayer of the American national trust into Pollard, committed Israeli patriot":

Shapiro stated that he was troubled by the support of Jewish organizations for Pollard: "We work so hard to establish ourselves and to get where we are, and to have somebody screw it up ... and then to have Jewish organizations line up behind this guy and try to make him out a hero of the Jewish people, it bothers the hell out of me."

Ron Olive, retired Naval Criminal Investigative Service, led the Pollard investigation. In his 2006 book, Capturing Jonathan Pollard – How One of the Most Notorious Spies in American History Was Brought to Justice, Olive wrote that Pollard did not serve Israel solely, but admitted passing secrets to South Africa, and to his financial advisers, and to shopping his access to Pakistan and other countries. Olive wrote that Pollard also stole classified documents related to China that his wife used to advance her personal business interests and attempted to broker arms deals with South Africa, Argentina, Taiwan, Pakistan, and Iran. Pollard's supporters deny these claims citing the 166-page CIA Damage Assessment Report which they say indicates he only passed information to Israel pertaining to Israeli security. Pollard wrote in his defense memorandum that his wife never profited from his espionage.  The reports were declassified in 2012.

New Republic editor Martin Peretz also argued against freeing Pollard: "Jonathan Pollard is not a Jewish martyr. He is a convicted espionage agent who spied on his country for both Israel and Pakistan (!)—a spy, moreover, who got paid for his work. His professional career, then, reeks of infamy and is suffused with depravity." Peretz called Pollard's supporters "professional victims, mostly brutal themselves, who originate in the ultra-nationalist and religious right. They are insatiable. And they want America to be Israel's patsy."

Former FBI and U.S. Navy lawyer M.E. "Spike" Bowman, a top legal adviser to navy intelligence at the time of Pollard's arrest who had intimate knowledge of the Pollard case, issued a detailed critique in 2011 of the case for clemency. "Because the case never went to trial, it is difficult for outside observers to understand the potential impact and complexity of the Pollard betrayal", he wrote. "There is no doubt that Pollard was devoted to Israel. However, the extent of the theft and the damage was far broader and more complex than evidenced by the single charge and sentence." In his estimation, Pollard "was neither a U.S. nor an Israeli patriot. He was a self-serving, gluttonous character seeking financial reward and personal gratification."

In September 2011, according to one report, Vice President Joe Biden—who was chairman of the Senate Judiciary Committee at the time of Pollard's arrest—told a group of rabbis, "President Obama was considering clemency, but I told him, 'Over my dead body are we going to let him out before his time. If it were up to me, he would stay in jail for life'." Biden later denied having used those precise words, but acknowledged that the report characterized his position accurately.

Parole
Laws in effect at the time of Pollard's sentencing mandated that federal inmates serving life sentences be paroled after 30 years of incarceration if no significant prison regulations had been violated, and if there was a "reasonable probability" that the inmate would not re-offend. On July 28, 2015, the United States Parole Commission announced that Pollard would be released on November 20, 2015. The U.S. Justice Department informed Pollard's legal team that it would not contest the Parole Commission's unanimous July 7 decision.

The terms of release set by the Parole Commission stipulated that Pollard must remain on parole for a minimum of five years. The US government could have legally extended his period of parole until 2030. His parole restrictions required him to remain in New York City unless granted special permission to travel outside. His parole officer was also authorized to impose a curfew and set exclusion zones within the city. He was ordered to wear electronic monitoring devices to track his movements. In addition, press interviews and Internet access without prior permission were prohibited. Pollard's attorneys appealed the conditions to the Parole Commission's appeals board, which removed only one restriction, that of requiring prior permission to use the Internet. However, it was ruled that his Internet use would be subjected to monitoring. Pollard's attorneys and Ayelet Shaked, Israel's Justice Minister, urged President Obama to exercise his powers of clemency to waive Pollard's parole requirements and allow him to move to Israel immediately; but a spokesman for the White House's National Security Council announced that the president would not intervene.

After his release on November 20, as scheduled, Pollard relocated to an apartment secured for him by his attorneys in New York City. A 7:00 pm to 7:00 am curfew was imposed on him. A job offer, as a research analyst at a Manhattan investment firm, was retracted due to the inspections to which his employer's computers would be subjected. His attorneys immediately filed a motion challenging the terms of his parole, arguing that the Internet restrictions rendered him unemployable as an analyst, and the GPS-equipped ankle bracelet was unnecessary, as he was not a flight risk. The filing included affidavits from McFarlane and former Senate Intelligence Committee member Dennis DeConcini declaring that any secrets learned by Pollard thirty years ago were no longer secret, and had no value today. On August 12, 2016, a federal judge denied the motion on the basis of a statement from James Clapper, the director of U.S. National Intelligence, asserting that contrary to the MacFarlane and DeConcini affidavits, much of the information stolen by Pollard in the 1980s remained secret. The judge also cited Pollard's Israeli citizenship, obtained during his incarceration, as evidence that he was indeed a flight risk.

A bill introduced in the Knesset in November 2015 would, if passed, authorize the Israeli government to fund Pollard's housing and medical expenses, and pay him a monthly stipend, for the remainder of his life. Reports that the Israelis had already been paying Pollard and his ex-wife during his incarceration were denied. After numerous delays, the bill was withdrawn from consideration in March 2016 at the request of Prime Minister Netanyahu and Israeli security officials, citing "diplomatic and security reasons".

In March 2017, Pollard's attorneys petitioned the United States Court of Appeals for the Second Circuit to reverse the August 2016 lower-court decision denying his request for more lenient parole restrictions. They argued that the prohibition against leaving his residence between 7 pm and 7 am forced him to violate Shabbat and Jewish holidays, and that surveillance of his computers prevented him from working at a job consistent with his education and intelligence. They further asserted that Pollard could not possibly remember information he saw before his arrest, and in any case, the parole conditions arbitrarily limited his computer usage, but not his ability to transfer information by other means. Netanyahu also reportedly renewed his request for a parole waiver during a meeting with Vice President Mike Pence. In May 2017, the court rejected the appeal, ruling that the parole conditions minimized the risk of harm he continued to pose to U.S. intelligence.

On November 20, 2020, Pollard's parole expired. The US Justice Department declined to extend the restrictions.

Emigration to Israel
Although Pollard expressed a desire to move to Israel, he did not immediately do so after his parole expired due to his wife's health issues, and remained in the US for over a month while she underwent chemotherapy for breast cancer. Pollard and his wife finally arrived in Israel on December 30, 2020, on a private jet owned by US billionaire Sheldon Adelson. They were greeted on arrival by Israeli Prime Minister Benjamin Netanyahu, who handed Pollard his Israeli documentation. Israeli Intelligence Minister Eli Cohen said that Pollard would be granted a government stipend equivalent to the pensions granted to former Mossad and Shin Bet agents. In accordance with COVID-19 restrictions, they went into quarantine for two weeks following their arrival. Pollard and his wife settled in Jerusalem. Esther Pollard died on January 31, 2022. She had been hospitalized for two weeks after contracting COVID-19.

In mid-September 2022, Pollard announced his engagement to Rivka Abrahams-Donin, a widowed mother of seven children. They married on October 20.

In popular culture

Pollard's story inspired the film Les Patriotes (The Patriots) by French director Éric Rochant in which American actor Richard Masur portrayed a character resembling Pollard.
Pollard's story inspired the stage play The Law of Return by playwright Martin Blank, which was produced Off-Broadway at the 4th Street Theater NYC. Blank is also developing a screenplay for the film adaptation of the play.

Pollard was mentioned by an anti-semitic defense lawyer in the Law & Order episode "Blood Libel". He is also mentioned in the Law and Order season 11 episode "Return".

Beit Yonatan, an Israeli-owned apartment building in Silwan, a neighborhood in East Jerusalem, is named after Pollard.

Street artist Solomon Souza added Pollard's portrait to his collection of spray paint art at the Mahane Yehuda Market after Pollard's release.

In 1995, a play called Pollard (alternatively titled Pollard's Trial) debuted at the Cameri Theatre in Tel Aviv. It was performed at the Knesset in 2011. The part of Pollard was played by Israeli actor Rami Baruch.

In 2012, SHI 360 released the song "Yonathan".

See also 
 Yosef Amit (born 1945), an Israeli convicted in 1987 for spying on Israel for the United States.
 Ben-Ami Kadish (1923–2012), former U.S. Army mechanical engineer, who admitted passing classified U.S. documents to Israel in the 1980s.
 Steven John Lalas (born 1953), former State Department communications officer, sentenced to 14 years in prison for passing sensitive military and diplomatic information to Greece.
 Israel Beer (1912–1966) was an Austrian-born Israeli citizen convicted of espionage for the former Soviet Union.
 Marcus Klingberg (1918–2015), was an Israeli scientist and the highest ranking Soviet spy ever caught in IsraelNotes

 References 
 
 
 
Goldenberg, Elliot (1993). The Spy who Knew Too Much: The Government Plot to Silence Jonathan Pollard: SP Books. .
  Henderson is the father of Pollard's wife, Anne
 Thomas, Gordon (1999). Gideon's Spies: The Secret History of the Mossad'' (2012 edition). Macmillan Publishers

External links
 Jonathan Pollard's Website
 All about Jonathan Pollard on Crime Library
 CRS Report for Congress RS20001 Jonathan Pollard: Background and Considerations for Presidential Clemency – Federation of American Scientists
National Security Achieve declassified documents
 CIA Damage Assessment. Declassified December 14, 2012
 
 

1954 births
Living people
American Orthodox Jews
American defectors
American people convicted of spying for Israel
American Zionists
Baalei teshuva
Criminals from Indiana
Criminals from Texas
Espionage in the United States
Espionage scandals and incidents
Incarcerated spies
Israeli spies
Jews and Judaism in Texas
Naturalized citizens of Israel
People from Dupont Circle
People from Galveston, Texas
People from South Bend, Indiana
People paroled from life sentence
People convicted under the Espionage Act of 1917
Prisoners sentenced to life imprisonment by the United States federal government
Stanford University alumni
American emigrants to Israel
Israeli people of American-Jewish descent
American people of Lithuanian-Jewish descent
Israeli people of Lithuanian-Jewish descent
Israel–United States relations